Calosoma viridisulcatum is a species of ground beetle in the subfamily of Carabinae. It was described by Maximilien Chaudoir in 1863.

References

viridisulcatum
Beetles described in 1863